Stranger on Horseback is a 1955 American Anscocolor Western film directed by Jacques Tourneur and starring Joel McCrea. The screenplay is based on a story by Louis L'Amour. It was filmed in and around Sedona, Arizona.

Plot
Rick Thorne, a circuit judge, rides into Bannerman and discovers everything in town is controlled by rich rancher Josiah Bannerman and his kin. He meets sheriff Nat Bell and district attorney Buck Streeter and asks why Bannerman's arrogant son, Tom, got away with killing a man without an arrest or trial.

Offered no assistance, Thorne stands up to Tom and then jails him. He becomes acquainted with Bannerman's beautiful niece, Amy Lee, who is attracted to Thorne but doubts her cousin Tom is a cold-blooded killer.

Thorne finds allies in Caroline and Vince Webb, who own a gun shop and are willing to testify with evidence against Tom in court. Thorne realizes he needs to sneak Tom and the Webbs to a different town if he's to get a fair trial. Bannerman and his men pursue them, and Amy Lee watches as Tom deliberately causes Vince Webb's death. In time, Thorne gets the prisoner to the next town safely, and Amy Lee goes to court to back him up.

Cast
 Joel McCrea as Judge Richard 'Rick' Thorne
 Miroslava as Amy Lee Bannerman
 Kevin McCarthy as Tom Bannerman
 John McIntire as Josiah Bannerman
 John Carradine as Col. Buck Streeter
 Nancy Gates as Caroline Webb
 Emile Meyer as Sheriff Nat Bell
 Robert Cornthwaite as Arnold Hammer
 Jaclynne Greene as Paula Morrison
 Walter Baldwin as Vince Webb
 Emmett Lynn as Barfly
 Roy Roberts as Sam Kettering
 George Keymas as Bannerman's Henchman
 Lane Bradford as Kettering Henchman (uncredited)
 Dabbs Greer as Hotel Clerk (uncredited)
 Frank Hagney as Bartender (uncredited)

See also
List of American films of 1955

References

External links
 
 
 

1955 Western (genre) films
1955 films
American Western (genre) films
1950s English-language films
United Artists films
Films directed by Jacques Tourneur
Films scored by Paul Dunlap
1950s American films